Horace Tracy Cahill (December 12, 1894 – August 22, 1976) was an American politician who served in the Massachusetts House of Representatives, as Speaker of the Massachusetts House of Representatives and, from 1939 to 1945, as the 54th Lieutenant Governor of Massachusetts. In 1944 Cahill was the unsuccessfully Republican candidate for governor.

Early life
Cahill was born to George William and Alice Gertrude (Dallon) Cahill in New York City on December 12, 1894.
After his father's death Cahill moved with his family to Boston, Massachusetts.

Career
Prior to becoming a politician, Cahill served in the United States Army in World War I. From 1947 to 1973 he was a Superior Court judge. There is an auditorium in Braintree, Massachusetts named in his honor.

See also
 Massachusetts legislature: 1929–1930, 1931–1932, 1933–1934, 1935–1936, 1937–1938

References

External links

1894 births
1976 deaths
Politicians from New York City
Politicians from Braintree, Massachusetts
United States Army personnel of World War I
Northeastern University alumni
Tufts University alumni
Republican Party members of the Massachusetts House of Representatives
Lieutenant Governors of Massachusetts
Speakers of the Massachusetts House of Representatives
20th-century American politicians